Alexander's Feast (HWV 75) is an ode with music by George Frideric Handel set to a libretto by Newburgh Hamilton. Hamilton adapted his libretto from John Dryden's ode Alexander's Feast, or the Power of Music (1697) which had been written to celebrate Saint Cecilia's Day. Jeremiah Clarke (whose score is now lost) set the original ode to music.

Handel composed the music in January 1736, and the work received its premiere at the Covent Garden Theatre, London, on 19 February 1736. In its original form it contained three concertos: a concerto in B flat major in 3 movements for "Harp, Lute, Lyrichord and other Instruments" HWV 294 for performance after the recitative Timotheus, plac'd on high in Part I; a concerto grosso in C major in 4 movements for oboes, bassoon and strings, now known as the "Concerto in Alexander's Feast" HWV 318, performed between Parts I and II; and an organ concerto HWV 289 in G minor and major in 4 movements for chamber organ, oboes, bassoon and strings performed after the chorus Let old Timotheus yield the prize in Part II. The organ concerto and harp concerto were published in 1738 by John Walsh as the first and last of the Handel organ concertos Op.4. Handel revised the music for performances in 1739, 1742 and 1751.  Donald Burrows has discussed Handel's revisions to the score.

The work describes a banquet held by Alexander the Great and his mistress Thaïs in the captured Persian city of Persepolis, during which the musician Timotheus sings and plays his lyre, arousing various moods in Alexander until he is finally incited to burn the city down in revenge for his dead Greek soldiers.

The piece was a great success and it encouraged Handel to make the transition from writing Italian operas to English choral works. The soloists at the premiere were the sopranos Anna Maria Strada and Cecilia Young, the tenor John Beard, and a bass called Erard (first name unknown).

Structure of the work
Part one:
 Overture
 Recitative (tenor): 'Twas at the royal feast
 Aria and chorus (tenor): Happy, happy pair
 Recitative: Timotheus plac'd on high
 Recitative (Soprano): The song began from Jove
 Recitative: The song began from Jove
 Chorus: The list'ning crowd
 Aria (soprano): With ravish'd ears
 Recitative: The praise of Bacchus
 Aria and chorus: Bacchus ever fair and young
 Recitative: Sooth'd with the sound
 Recitative: He chose a mournful muse
 Aria (soprano): He sung Darius, great and good
 Recitative: With downcast looks
 Chorus: Behold Darius great and good
 Recitative: The mighty master smil'd
 Arioso (soprano): Softly sweet in Lydian measures
 Aria (tenor): War, he sung, is toil and trouble
 Chorus: The many rend the skies with loud applause
 Aria (soprano): The prince, unable to conceal his pain
 Chorus: The many rend the skies with loud applause

Part two:
 Recitative and chorus: Now strike the golden lyre again
 Aria (bass): Revenge, Timotheus cries
 Recitative: Give vengeance the due
 Aria (tenor): The princes applaud with a furious joy
 Aria and chorus (soprano): Thais led the way
 Recitative (tenor): Thus long ago
 Chorus: At last divine Cecilia came
 Recitative (soloists + chorus): Let old Timotheus yield the prize
 Chorus: Let old Timotheus yield the prize
 Organ concerto, Opus 4 Number 1
 Chorus: Your voices tune

Recordings
 Alexander's Feast or The Power of Musick, HWV 75: Honor Sheppard, soprano; Max Worthley, tenor; Maurice Bevan, bass; Oriana Concert Choir & Orchestra, conducted by Alfred Deller; Recorded 1964 (Authentic Instruments) — 2 LP Bach Guild BG-666—BG-667
 Alexander's Feast or The Power of Music, HWV 75: Felicity Palmer, soprano; Anthony Rolfe Johnson, tenor; Stephen Roberts, bass; Stockholm Bach Choir & Concentus Musicus Wien, conducted by Nikolaus Harnoncourt; Recorded 1977 (Authentic Instruments) — 2 LP Teldec 6.35440 [1978] — 2 CD Teldec 6 3984-26796-2 6 [2000]
 Alexander's Feast or The Power of Music,: Helen Donath, soprano-1; Sally Burgess, soprano-2; Robert Tear, tenor; Thomas Allen, baritone; Choir of King's College, Cambridge & English Chamber Orchestra, conducted by Philip Ledger; Recorded 1978 (Modern Instruments) at King's College Chapel – 2 LP EMI 1C 157 03 404/5 [1979] — 2 CD Virgin Classics, (as part of 5-CD boxset:) Virgin Classics 5 62118 2 [2003])
 Alexander's Feast: Donna Brown, soprano; Carolyn Watkinson, contralto; Ashley Stafford, countertenor; Nigel Robson, tenor; Stephen Varcoe, bass; Monteverdi Choir & English Baroque Soloists, conducted by John Eliot Gardiner; Recorded live in 1987 (Authentic Instruments) at the Stadthalle Göttingen – 2 CD Philips 422 053-2 [1988], Philips 00289 475 777–4 [2006]
 Alexander's Feast: Nancy Argenta, soprano; Ian Partridge, tenor; Michael George, bass; The Sixteen, conducted by Harry Christophers; Recorded 1990 (Authentic Instruments) – 2 CD Collins Classics 70 162 [1991], Musical Society Heritage 525259X [1998], Coro COR16028 [2004]

Alexander's Feast today: performances and recordings
The soprano aria War, he sung, is toil and trouble was featured in Alfonso Cuaron's film Children of Men.

References

External links
 
 Full-text libretto hosted by Stanford University.
 Score of Alexander's Feast (ed. Friedrich Chrysander, Leipzig 1861)
 

1736 compositions
1736 in England
Oratorios by George Frideric Handel
Cultural depictions of Alexander the Great
Cultural depictions of Thaïs